Danylo Danylenko (born 10 October 1994) is a Ukrainian athlete specialising in the 400 metres hurdles. He competed in the 4 × 400 metres relay at the 2014 World Indoor Championships finishing sixth.

International competitions

Personal bests
Outdoor
200 metres – 21.80 (-1.5 m/s, Lutsk 2016)
400 metres – 46.09 (Naples 2019)
400 metres hurdles – 50.50 (Kirovograd 2015)
Indoor
200 metres – 22.34 (Kiev 2016)
400 metres – 47.12 (Istanbul 2019)

References

1994 births
Living people
Sportspeople from Cherkasy
Ukrainian male hurdlers
Ukrainian male sprinters
Athletes (track and field) at the 2019 European Games
European Games medalists in athletics
European Games gold medalists for Ukraine
Competitors at the 2019 Summer Universiade